Charles Smith Wilkinson (22 August 1843 – 26 August 1891) was an Australian geologist. He became geological surveyor in charge in New South Wales in 1875 and was president of the Royal Society of New South Wales in 1887.

Early life
Wilkinson was born at Pottersbury, Northamptonshire, England, the fourth son of David Wilkinson, C.E., who was associated with George Stephenson in the production of early locomotives. The family moved to Melbourne, Victoria in 1852, and the young Wilkinson was educated at a private school conducted by the Rev. T. P. Fenner.

Career
In December 1859 Wilkinson was given a position in the Geological Survey of Victoria under Alfred Richard Cecil Selwyn. In 1861 he became a field assistant to Richard Daintree with whom he was associated in the survey of part of southern Victoria. In 1863 he was sent to explore the Cape Otway (Victoria) region and in 1866 succeeded Daintree when the latter left for Queensland. In 1868 Wilkinson's health broke down; he resigned from the survey, and spent the next four years at Wagga Wagga, New South Wales. He passed the examination for licensed surveyor in 1872, and was sent by the surveyor-general of New South Wales to the new tin-mining district in New England, New South Wales, on which he reported, and in 1874 he was appointed geological surveyor.

In 1875 Wilkinson was transferred to the mines department with the title of geological surveyor in charge. The systematic geological survey of New South Wales was begun under his direction, and valuable work was done. He urged Joseph Edmund Carne to study geology, subsequently in 1879, Carne joined the survey as assistant to Wilkinson. In 1876 Wilkinson was elected a fellow of the Geological Society of London and in 1881 a fellow of the Linnean Society. In 1882 Edgeworth David was appointed assistant geological surveyor, Wilkinson delegated much responsibility to him.

Late life and legacy
In 1883 and 1884 Wilkinson was president of the Linnean Society of New South Wales and in 1887 president of the Royal Society of New South Wales. He died after a short illness on 26 August 1891. He was survived by his wife and two sons (including a daughter born shortly after his death). His Notes on the Geology of New South Wales was published by the mines department in 1882, and about 80 of his reports and papers are listed in the Journal and Proceedings of the Royal Society of New South Wales for 1892, p. 9.

Wilkinson was respected by his colleagues, who did good work in connexion with the mining industry, and was the first to suggest to the government the possibility of finding subterranean water in western New South Wales. The first bore was put down under his direction. The fine collection of minerals in the Sydney geological survey museum was founded and largely brought together by him.

His name was commemorated in the fossil species of an early amphibian, Platyceps wilkinsonii Stephens 1887, after making the specimen used in its original description available to William John Stephens.

Notes

References

Attribution
 

Additional references from the Dictionary of Australian Biography:
H. C. Russell, Journal and Proceedings of the Royal Society of New South Wales, 1892, p. 6;
The Sydney Morning Herald, 27 August 1891
J. H. Heaton, Australian Dictionary of Dates; The Geological Magazine, 1891, pp. 571–3.

Additional references from the Australian Dictionary of Biography :
Votes and Proceedings (Legislative Assembly, Victoria), 1868, 2 (15)
Votes and Proceedings (Legislative Assembly, New South Wales), 1871–72, 2, 305
Engineering Assn of New South Wales, Proceedings, 6 (1890–91)
Linnean Society of New South Wales, Proceedings, 16 (1891)
Mining Journal (London), 17 Oct 1891
E. J. Dunn and Daniel James Mahony, Biographical sketch of the founders of the Geological Survey of Victoria, Victorian Geological Survey, Bulletin, 23 (1910)
Town and Country Journal, 16 February 1889, 29 August, 5 September 1891
Australasian, 13 September 1890, 29 August 1891.

External links
State Library of New South Wales 2002, 'Photographs - Dry plate. 8.5 x 6.5 in. P. of CS Wilkinson', NSW Government Printing Office : collection of copy negatives, 1870–1988

1843 births
1891 deaths
Australian geologists
British emigrants to colonial Australia
Fellows of the Linnean Society of London
Members of the Linnean Society of New South Wales
Fellows of the Geological Society of London
Otway Ranges